Cyclotosaurus is an extinct genus of  temnospondyl within the family Mastodonsauridae.

Etymology
The name means "round eared lizard" in Ancient Greek, derived from round openings or fenestrae in the cheeks, which are thought to contain structures of the middle ear.

History

German naturalist Eberhard Fraas erected the genus Cyclotosaurus in 1889, with C. robustus (previously Mastodonsaurus robustus) as the type species. Several species are known, mainly from Germany and Poland in Central Europe, as well as East Greenland and Thailand. The relationships between species is unclear. 

"Labyrinthodon" pachygnathus Owen, 1842 and "L." leptognathus Owen, 1842 were transferred to Cyclotosaurus, as C. pachygnathus and C. leptognathus, by Paton (1974). However, Damiani (2001) assigned the two species to Mastodonsauroidea indeterminate and Stereospondyli indeterminate.

Palaeontology

The genus is known from the Ladinian in the Middle Triassic to the Norian in the Late Triassic, and represents the last of the Mastodonsaurids.

The oldest, questionable, species is Cyclotosaurus papilio, known from a partial skull recovered from the Ladinian (Middle Triassic) age Upper Muschelkalk beds from Baden-Württemberg in Germany. Cyclotosaurus robustus is known from the  Carnian (Late Triassic) Schilfsandstein Formation in Stuttgart-Feuerbach in Germany, while C. ebrachensis has been described from the Blasensandstein Formation in Ebrach. Cyclotosaurus intermedius has been described from lacustrine deposits dated to the late Carnian  in Krasiejów in southern Poland. It is so named as it has features intermediate between the more ancient C. robustus and more recent C. mordax. Importantly, postcranial material of this species has been recovered, which is unusual this genus. Cyclotosaurus hemprichi is known from the Norian (Late Triassic) age Knollenmergel of Halberstadt, and Cyclotosaurus posthumus from the Stubensandstein (Norian) in Pfaffenhofen. A partial skull very similar to C. posthumus has been recovered from the Norian (Late Triassic) Huai Hin Lat Formation near Chulabhorn Dam in Northeastern Thailand. In 2016 a new species, C. buechneri, was described from the Late Triassic (middle Carnian) Stuttgart Formation of Bielefeld, the northernmost record in Germany.
In 2017, Cyclotosaurus naraserluki, a new endemic species from the Fleming Fjord Fm., East Greenland, was described as the closest Cyclotosaurus species to C. mordax, also being the westernmost and northernmost known species of Cyclotosaurus. In 2019 a Cyclotosaurus humerus was reported from a Rhaetian aged bone bed within Bonenburg clay pit in eastern North Rhine-Westphalia, Germany. This represents the only definitive non-brachyopoid Rhaetian temnospondyl, and the last known record of Capitosauria.

Phylogeny 
The phylogeny of Capitosauroidea according to Witzmann et al. (2016).

The phylogeny of the genus Cyclotosaurus according to Witzmann et al. (2016).

See also alternative phylogenies from 2017 with the description of C. naraserluki.

Ecology
Cyclotosaurus are thought to have been semi-aquatic carnivores, though feeding strategies likely differed between species.

References

Triassic temnospondyls of Europe
Fossil taxa described in 1889
Prehistoric amphibian genera
Taxa named by Eberhard Fraas